Østby may refer to:

Places
Østby, Innlandet, a village in the municipality of Trysil in Innlandet county, Norway
Østby, Trøndelag, a village in the municipality of Tydal in Trøndelag county, Norway

See also
Østbye, a surname
Østbyen, Norway
Vestby, Norway
Nordby (disambiguation)
Sörby (disambiguation)